This is a list of Wikipedia articles about film festivals in Europe.

Albania

Armenia

Austria

Azerbaijan

Belarus

Belgium

Bosnia and Herzegovina

Bulgaria

Croatia

Czech Republic

Cyprus

Denmark

Estonia

Finland

France

Germany

Greece

Hungary

Iceland

Ireland

Italy

Kosovo

Latvia

Lithuania

Monaco

Netherlands

North Macedonia

Norway

Poland

Portugal

Romania

Russia

Serbia

Slovakia

Slovenia

Spain

Sweden

Switzerland

Turkey

Ukraine

United Kingdom

England

Northern Ireland

Scotland

Wales

References

External links
 Movie festivals and events worldwide at the Internet Movie Database
 International Film Festival Database
 FilmFestivals.com
 Ominous Events: The Horror Fests and Cons Database

Film
 
Lists of film festivals by continent